The 1916–17 season was Port Vale's first season of football after going into abeyance during World War I. They were admitted into the Football League's Lancashire Region, going up against some of the country's biggest clubs after years of playing non-league football. Losing 16 of their 30 league games, they still managed a remarkable 11–1 victory over Blackpool.

Overview
Following a year in effective hibernation, the club reinstated first-team football after chairman Frank Huntbach "realised that the war workers needed recreation as much as ever and as long as the players were men working for the war effort, no harm could be done". The club were fortunate to gain admittance to the Football League's Lancashire Region, allowing them to compete with clubs such as Liverpool, Manchester City and Preston North End. Manager Tom Holford re-signed Teddy Bateup, Edgar Bentley, Jim Bennett, Jack Shelton, Joe Brough and Jock Cameron to give some continuation of the team that had competed well in The Central League. However attempts to re-sign former top-scorer Chris Young failed as he opted to stay with Grimsby Town.

Vale started the league campaign well with a 2–2 draw with Manchester United at Old Trafford and a 0–0 draw with Liverpool at the Old Recreation Ground. The squad was boosted by the arrivals of Ted Collins and Jack Needham, who signed after their club Wolverhampton Wanderers shut down operations. The pair "showed their true regard for the game" by turning up to play Stockport County on 16 September despite working until 6 am earlier that day; however former Valeite Bob Suart inspired County to a 5–3 win. Two more draws followed, including a 0–0 draw at Stoke, though this was then followed by five defeats in six games. The 13th game of the campaign proved unlucky for visitors Blackpool, as Vale recorded their first victory by a remarkable 11–1 scoreline, with Jack Needham, Holford, James Wootton, Albert Broadhurst and George Shelton all claiming two goals each, supplemented by a single strike for Albert Groves. They then beat Oldham Athletic 4–0, before dropping into a losing streak of seven defeats in nine games to prove the Blackpool result as an anomaly as the club dropped to last place. They recovered to lose only three of their final eight games, though the final day victory over Manchester United proved "a farce" as the visitors only turned up with four players and had to loan the other seven to make up a full team. Vale finished in 15th-place with 21 points from 30 games, whilst Needham finished as top-scorer with ten goals.

A six-match Subsidiary Tournament concluded the season, with the Vale going unbeaten at home against Stoke, Manchester City and Manchester United. They recorded a 3–2 victory over Stoke and beat United 5–2 after being helped by guest player Billy Meredith. The club's annual meeting revealed a profit of £692 as the gate receipts of £2,582 were well above the playing wages of £649. Wartime football was profitable but had its unique challenges, with Holdford, Brough, Needham, Bentley and Jack Shelton all needing replacing at the end of the season as they were conscripted.

Results
Port Vale's score comes first

Legend

Football League Lancashire Section

League table

Matches

Lancashire Section Subsidiary Tournament

League table

Matches

Player statistics

Appearances

Top scorers

Transfers

Transfers in

Transfers out

References
Specific

General

Port Vale F.C. seasons
Port Vale